Fabrizio Branciforte (1551 – 1624) was an aristocrat, 3rd prince of Butera and Count of Mazarin. He was knighted into the Order of the Golden Fleece in 1607.

Biography
He was born to Giovanni, IV count of Mazarin, and Dorotea Barresi Santapau, princess of Pietraperzia. In April 1566, upon the death of his father, he was awarded his fiefdoms under regency; for which he was reinvested formally on 16 November 1557.

In 1571, he married Caterina Barresi Branciforte, sister of the deceased Vincenzo, Marquis of Militello and second husband of her mother Dorotea, and through this union the Branciforte thus acquired the possession of the Marquisate of Militello. In 1580, his maternal great-uncle Francesco Santapau Branciforte, prince of Butera, who had no children, designated Fabrizio as heir of the Principality of Butera and of the fief of Occhiolà, of which he was invested on the 8th December 1591, as well as of the Principality of Pietraperzia, inherited from his mother who died in that same year.

He was a poor feudal administrator, and his massive estate lost money. He had contracted substantial debts with the Qàbala of Palermo since his youth. The administration of the family assets passed to the eldest son Francesco Branciforte Barresi, with whom he had numerous quarrels and who had him banned from Palermo until 1621.

As Prince of Butera, he was a deputy of the Kingdom of Sicily in the years 1594, 1603, 1606, 1609, 1615 and 1618. On September 30, 1612, he was conferred by King Philip III of Spain the dignity of Grand of Spain of the first class, confirmed in 1625. He died in Palermo.

Fabrizio Branciforte Barresi and his wife, the marchesa Caterina Barresi Branciforte, had nine children: Francesco, Giovanni, Vincenzo, Pietro, Filippo, Dorotea, Caterina, Imara, and Isabella.

References
Derived from Italian Wikipedia entry

1551 births
1624 deaths
Sicilian nobility
Knights of the Golden Fleece